Keiynan Lonsdale (born 19 December 1991) is an Australian actor, dancer, and singer-songwriter. He is known for roles such as Oliver Lloyd in the ABC series Dance Academy (2012–2013), Wally West/Kid Flash in the CW series The Flash (2015–2023) and Legends of Tomorrow (2017–2018), and Abraham "Bram" Greenfeld in the film Love, Simon (2018). His other films include The Divergent Series: Insurgent (2015) and The Finest Hours (2016). Lonsdale has also worked as an MTV VJ and released original music recordings, including a studio album in 2020.

Early life 
Lonsdale was born in Sydney to a Nigerian father of Edo descent and an Australian mother of Irish and Danish descent. He has eleven siblings.

Career 
Lonsdale's first acting job was in 2007, with a dancing part in the film Razzle Dazzle: A Journey into Dance. The following year, he appeared in an episode of the Australian television medical drama All Saints. Lonsdale became a recurring member of the cast of the Australian teen drama series Dance Academy in the 2012 second season as the character Oliver Lloyd, who became a regular in the third and final season.

Lonsdale was a VJ on MTV for two and a half years. He released a single on iTunes titled "One and Only" in 2014. He then played a supporting role as Uriah Pedrad in The Divergent Series: Insurgent (2015), the second film in the series, later briefly reprising said role in The Divergent Series: Allegiant (2016). In 2016, his single "Higher" was included on Connor Franta's curated album Common Culture, volume 5. Lonsdale next appeared in the historical drama The Finest Hours (2016) as Eldon Hanon, the youngest sailor involved in a rescue at sea.

In 2015, Lonsdale auditioned for the role of Jefferson Jackson, but the role was given to Franz Drameh. Instead, he was cast as Wally West (the previously unknown son of Joe West) on CW's The Flash and became a regular supporting character in season two and as Kid Flash in season three. In 2017, the character left The Flash and debuted on season three of Legends of Tomorrow. That year, Lonsdale also appeared in an episode of Supergirl.

In 2018, Lonsdale starred as Bram in the film Love, Simon, based on the novel Simon vs. the Homo Sapiens Agenda by Becky Albertalli about a teenage boy who struggles to come out. Lonsdale later said the role helped in coming to terms with his own sexuality. Upon release, the film received positive reviews from critics, and was dubbed historically significant, as it is the first film ever released by a major studio to focus on a gay teenage romance.

In 2019, Lonsdale starred in Camila Cabello's music video for "Liar". He has also released musical recordings, including "Higher" in 2015, "Good Life" in 2017, "Kiss the Boy" in 2018, and "Preach" in 2018. Lonsdale also released a single "Rainbow Dragon" in 2019.

Personal life
In 2017, Lonsdale came out on Instagram saying "I like girls, & I like guys". Lonsdale previously did not self-identify with a specific sexuality label, but described himself as gay in a 2022 interview for BuzzFeed.

Discography

Studio albums

Extended plays

Singles

Filmography

Awards and nominations

References

External links 

 

1991 births
Living people
21st-century Australian male actors
Australian male film actors
Australian male television actors
Australian people of Danish descent
Australian people of Irish descent
Australian people of Nigerian descent
Australian LGBT singers
Australian gay actors
Gay musicians
Male actors from Sydney
Australian expatriates in Canada